Friends in High Places may refer to:

Friends in High Places (George Jones album), 1991
Friends in High Places (Hillsong album), 1995

See also
In High Places (disambiguation)
Friends in Low Places (disambiguation)